Hayes River may refer to:

Hayes River (British Columbia)
Hayes River, in Manitoba
Hayes River (Nunavut)